Aleksandr Klimov (born 12 August 1965) is a Soviet speed skater. He competed in at the 1988 Winter Olympics and the 1992 Winter Olympics.

References

1965 births
Living people
Soviet male speed skaters
Olympic speed skaters of the Soviet Union
Olympic speed skaters of the Unified Team
Speed skaters at the 1988 Winter Olympics
Speed skaters at the 1992 Winter Olympics
Sportspeople from Smolensk